"Grace Darling" is a song by English band Strawbs, featured on their 1975 album Ghosts.

Recording 
The track was recorded in the chapel of the Charterhouse School, which the members of the band Genesis had attended in the 1960s, and which Strawbs' producer at the time, Tom Allom, had also attended.

According to Dave Cousins, the chapel's pipe organ was used, played by the Alastair Ross, choirmaster and organist of St Lawrence's Church, West Wycombe; the band's keyboardist, John Hawken, chose not play on the recording, as he was not used to the very noticeable delay that falls between the pressing of a key on a pipe organ and the sounding of the corresponding note. 

During the recording of the album, Cousins fell ill and spent some time in hospital, returning to the studio after a lumbar puncture to record his vocals lying on the studio floor.

Lyrical and musical content
The title derives from the refrain "You are my saving grace/Darling, I love you," which references the Victorian heroine Grace Darling. The lyrics contain references to storms, lifeboats and other nautical-related items. The song compares the singer's paramour to the famous lighthouse keeper's daughter, expressing gratitude that she is steadfast and has helped him through dark times with her constant love.

The song has a three-verse structure with a middle section between verses two and three. An instrumental section is heard at the beginning and end and also preceding the middle section. The predominant instruments are the pipe organ and the choir, giving the song a classical or hymnal feel.

The song was re-recorded in 1975 with a set of French lyrics and entitled "Chérie, Je T'aime" for release in Canada, to appeal to Strawbs' French Canadian audience.

The sleeve notes to the 1998 CD re-issue of Ghosts report that a promotional video was recorded for the single featuring an interview with Cousins on board a lifeboat. Whilst still photos were available, it was thought that video had not survived, but the film was included as a bonus on the 2003 Strawbs Live In Tokyo/Grave New World DVD.

B-side 
The B-side track "Changes Arrange Us" is a Rod Coombes composition, which does not feature on the album. The record label shows the title incorrectly as "Changes Arranges"

The B-side of the 1975 French Canadian release is "Heroine's Theme", the first part of the song "Autumn" from the album Hero and Heroine, composed by keyboard player John Hawken.

Release history

Other recordings
The track was rearranged and recorded by a different line-up of the band for the album Ringing Down the Years. Dave Cousins and Brian Willoughby also recorded it for their album Old School Songs.

Personnel
Dave Cousins – lead vocals, acoustic guitar
Dave Lambert – electric guitar
Chas Cronk – bass guitar
Rod Coombes – drums

with

Alastair Ross – pipe organ
Charterhouse School, Godalming, Surrey – choir

References

External links
"Grace Darling" at Strawbsweb
Lyrics to "Grace Darling" at Strawbsweb official site
Lyrics to "Changes Arrange Us" at Strawbsweb official site

1974 singles
Strawbs songs
1974 songs
Songs written by Dave Cousins
A&M Records singles